Smith Fork may refer to:

Smith Fork (Colorado), a tributary of the Gunnison River
Smith Fork (Missouri), a stream
Smith Fork (Tennessee), a stream